A news channel is a specialty television channel which focus on presenting news content.

News channel may also refer to:

 CTV News Channel (disambiguation)
 Fox News Channel, an American news network
 TVB News Channel, Hong Kong 24-hour non-stop news channel
 the Wii Menu channel